The Octagon will be the new headquarters for the Egyptian Ministry of Defense, being a part of a much larger initiative of moving all governmental offices to the New Administrative Capital. The establishment of the new headquarters aims to be the largest in the Middle East and the world, located in the New Capital, Greater Cairo.

It includes 13 zones – each with its own specific role – making it the largest defense headquarters and office building complex in the world surpassing The Pentagon in the United States. The Octagon is a part of a big establishment, which as a whole has worship venues, clubs, hotels, schools, playgrounds, residential projects, shopping malls, hospitals, and complexes for civil and administrative services. The place is secured by two Republican Guard units, and other means of security.

The Six Centers 

The (Octagon) State Strategic Command Center is composed of six centers:

 The Unified Strategic Data Center - has all the data of the state institutions.
 The Control Center of the Strategic Network - controls the administrative body of the state.
 State Utilities Management and Operation Center - controls state agencies and facilities.
 Telecommunications Network Control Center - ensures the stability of communications nationwide.
 Emergencies and Safety Center - governs emergency services and field security services.
 Weather Forecast Center - prepares the state defense center in case of any natural calamities.

In addition to a number of warehouses that secure the country's needs of strategic goods.

Structure 

The Octagon acquired its name because of its octagon-like architectural design, made up of the eight outer octagon-shaped buildings, thus representing all eight branches of the Egyptian Armed Forces. The entity as a whole consists of 10 buildings, 8 of which are external and two internal ones. Each building has eight facets connected to each other, with corridors connected to the heart of the structure known as the "main building," which is located in the middle. While there are 2 central ministerial buildings located in the center of the octagonal structure, both connected to each other and to the rest of the eight external buildings by longitudinal corridors.

Design and architecture 
The Egyptian Ministry of Defense/Ministry of War headquarters' architecture was influenced by Ancient Egyptian architecture, as they've used pillars to support the buildings in a Pharaonic style.

References 

Buildings and structures in Cairo
Octagonal buildings
Government ministries of Egypt
Egypt
Military headquarters
Joint military headquarters
Military installations of Egypt
Egyptian Air Force
Egyptian Navy
Egyptian military personnel